Mask of Dust (later named 'Race for Life' ) is a 1954 British motor racing drama film directed by Terence Fisher and starring Richard Conte, Mari Aldon and Peter Illing. The film was based on the 1953 novel The Last Race by Jon Manchip White. It was produced by Hammer Films at the company's Bray Studios as a programmer. The film's sets were designed by the art director J. Elder Wills. It was released in the United States by Lippert Pictures as Race for Life

Synopsis
A freestyle racing driver must choose between his love for racing, and his wife. His friend's accident will help him to choose, and his loyal ways will get him a new friend - his main rival.

Cast
Richard Conte as Peter Wells
Mari Aldon as Patricia Wells
Peter Illing as Tony Bellario
Alec Mango as Guido Rosetti
James Copeland as Johnny Jackson
George Coulouris as 'Pic' Dallapiccola
Meredith Edwards as Laurence Gibson
Edwin Richfield as Reporter in Lounge
Richard Marner as Hans Brecht
Tim Turner as Alvarez
Jeremy Hawk as Martin
Stirling Moss as Stirling Moss
Reg Parnell as Reg Parnell
John Cooper as John Cooper
Alan Brown as Alan Brown
Leslie Marr as Leslie Marr
 John Welsh as Priest 
 Paul Carpenter as Racetrack Announcer
 Raymond Baxter as Racetrack Announcer (uncredited)

References

Bibliography
 Chibnall, Steve & McFarlane, Brian. The British 'B' Film. Palgrave MacMillan, 2009.

External links

1954 films
1954 drama films
British drama films
Films directed by Terence Fisher
British black-and-white films
Films based on British novels
British auto racing films
Hammer Film Productions films
Lippert Pictures films
Films shot at Bray Studios
1950s English-language films
1950s British films